Adrian Ungur was the defending champion, but lost in the second round to Martín Cuevas.

Damir Džumhur won the title, defeating Pere Riba in the final, 6–4, 7–6(7–3)

Seeds

  Pere Riba (final)
  Victor Hănescu (second round)
  Frank Dancevic (first round)
  Adrian Ungur (second round)
  Damir Džumhur (champion)
  Gerald Melzer (second round)
  Guido Andreozzi (first round)
  Marius Copil (first round)

Draw

Finals

Top half

Bottom half

References
 Main Draw
 Qualifying Draw

BRD Arad Challengerandnbsp;- Singles
2014 Singles